Adonay Alfaro Murcia is a former Costa Rican Soccer player who played in Costa Rican Primera Division and Segunda Division organized by FEDEFUTBOL. He also played in the USISL D-3 Pro League, and the Canadian National Soccer League. He is an experienced  Web and Graphic Designer now living in San Jose, CR.

Playing career 
Murcia moved to Canada in 1992, and played with Toronto Blizzards on the APSL. Also Played for Toronto Croatia and  Toronto Supra of the Canadian National Soccer League. He would help Supra finish third in the league standings, and secured a postseason berth for the club. They were eliminated in the semi-finals and lost the series on 2-1 on goals on aggregate to the St. Catharines Wolves. In 1997, he abroad to the United States and signed with San Antonio Pumas of the USISL D-3 Pro League. During his tenure with San Antonio he helped the club reach the playoffs, before they were eliminated in the division finals to the Houston Hurricanes. After the 1997 season he retired from competitive football, and enrolled to San Antonio College, graduated with honors  and is currently working in  Web design.

References 

Living people
Costa Rican men's footballers
SC Toronto players
San Antonio Pumas players
USL Second Division players
Web designers
Canadian National Soccer League players
Association football midfielders
Year of birth missing (living people)
Costa Rican expatriate footballers
Costa Rican expatriate sportspeople in the United States
Costa Rican expatriate sportspeople in Canada
Expatriate soccer players in Canada
Expatriate soccer players in the United States
Footballers from San José, Costa Rica